John Thomas Tipps (January 25, 1923 – February 21, 2013) was an American businessman and politician.

Born in Zaneis, Oklahoma, Tipps served in the United States Army during World War II. Tipps and his wife owned a family business in Ardmore, Oklahoma. Tipps served in the Oklahoma House of Representatives 1952–1954 and the Oklahoma State Senate 1954–1962. He died in Ardmore, Oklahoma.

Notes

1923 births
2013 deaths
People from Ardmore, Oklahoma
Businesspeople from Oklahoma
Democratic Party members of the Oklahoma House of Representatives
Democratic Party Oklahoma state senators
20th-century American businesspeople
United States Army personnel of World War II